Tropojë District was one of the 36 districts of Albania, which were dissolved in July 2000 and replaced by 12 newly created counties. It was in the north of the country, and its capital was the town of Bajram Curri. The area is known for its massive chestnuts forests and the river Valbonë, as well a rich folk culture.

Administrative divisions
The district consisted of the following municipalities:
Bajram Curri
Bujan
Bytyç
Fierzë
Lekbibaj
Llugaj
Margegaj
Tropojë

Note: - urban municipalities in bold

References

Districts of Albania
Geography of Kukës County